Amy Gordon (born Seattle, USA, 1974) is an American actress and singer based in Brooklyn.

Early years 
Dedicated to acting since childhood, Gordon earned a BA in Theater Arts magna cum laude from Western Washington University. In her early years as an artist, she trained in theater, comedy, and singing.

Career 
While working as a choreographer for the play A Mouthful of Birds, she founded a production company called Crossbreeding Productions, with Michelle Matlock. They produced various plays in the East Village.

In 2001 she joined Jonah Logan, with whom she worked at Bindlestiff Family Cirkus, and they created the Daredevil Opera Company, with which for six years they developed 5 shows that they presented at the New Victory Theater on Broadway and around the world.

Gordon was the first comedian to lead the Big Apple Circus.

To date, one of her biggest roles has been in Tyler Perry's A Fall From Grace.

With her solo show, Entershamement, she toured for over 7 years in various countries (UK, Ireland, Australia, France, Germany, Austria and Czech Republic. Until 2020, she had made 52 works, presented in 40 countries, in 7 languages.

Major plays 

 Cirkus Inferno
 La Soireé
 Anti-Gravity’s Crash Test Dummies
 Entershamement
 Amy G: Round She Goes
 Amy G: On a Roll
 Absinthe 2006

Awards 

 2014 Off-Broadway Theatre League's "Best Unique Theatrical Experience"  - La Soireé

References 

American artists
Artists from Seattle
American women artists
American stage actresses
American theatre directors
Women theatre directors